Gagik (died 1058) was a King of Kakheti and Hereti in eastern Georgia from 1039 to 1058.

Life 
He was a son of the Armenian Bagratid king David I of Lorri and his Georgian wife, sister of King Kvirike III of Kakheti who adopted Gagik as his son and heir. When Kvirike III died in 1029, King Bagrat IV of Georgia annexed Kakheti to his kingdom, but, in 1039, the Kakhetian nobility succeeded in restoring monarchy and installed Gagik as king. Through maneuvering between Bagrat IV and the powerful Georgian warlord Liparit Orbeliani Gagik managed to retain his crown and the integrity of his kingdom. He aided Bagrat in his expeditions against the Emirate of Tbilisi, but when the king of Georgia attempted to take Gagik's possessions in Hereti, Gagik allied himself with Liparit in the 1046-47 rebellion against Bagrat IV and achieved more or less stable control of his territories. He was succeeded by his son Aghsartan I.

References

Bibliography 
 

1058 deaths
Kings of Kakheti and Hereti
Year of birth unknown